Mason Forbes is an American college basketball player for the Saint Mary's Gaels of the WCC.

High school career
Forbes played his high school stint at Folsom High School in his hometown of Folsom, California.

Collegiate career

Harvard Crimson (2018–2022)
In January 2018, Forbes committed to play for the Harvard Crimson as he will attend the prestigious Harvard University. His signing was a little bit of shock since he was not in the top-100 in the nation's list of star-studded basketball players coming off from high school. After committing, he expressed his delight to be part of the Harvard community.

On November 24, 2018, Forbes recorded 5 points and 2 rebounds in just 13 minutes of playing time in a 74–68 win over Saint Mary's. He scored a freshman high of 9 points in an 83–81 overtime victory over the Columbia Lions.

St. Mary's Gaels (2022–Present)
In May 2022, it has been reported that Forbes would be transferring schools whereas he would play once again in his home state of California, this time for Randy Bennett and the Saint Mary's Gaels.

Career statistics

College

|-
| style="text-align:left;"| 2018–19
| style="text-align:left;"| Harvard
| 21 || 2 || 8.6 || .688 || – || .500 || 1.0 || .1 || .1 || .2 || 2.4
|-
| style="text-align:left;"| 2019–20
| style="text-align:left;"| Harvard
| 28 || 2 || 10.1 || .610 || – || .583 || 2.1 || .4 || .2 || .6 || 3.6
|-
| style="text-align:left;"| 2021–22
| style="text-align:left;"| Harvard
| 11 || 10 || 26.6 || .597 || – || .538 || 5.3 || 1.2 || .4 || .8 || 8.0
|- class="sortbottom"
| style="text-align:center;" colspan="2"| Career
| 60 || 14 || 12.6 || .621 || – || .558 || 2.3 || .4 || .2 || .5 || 4.0

Personal life
Forbes' father, Sterling, was an 11th round draft pick of the Los Angeles Lakers but never got the chance to play for them. His father and grandfather played for the Harlem Globetrotters albeit during different eras.

References

External links
Mason Forbes at Eurobasket.com

Living people
African-American basketball players
American men's basketball players
Basketball players from California
Harvard Crimson men's basketball players
People from Folsom, California
Power forwards (basketball)
Year of birth missing (living people)